Allocasuarina microstachya is a shrub of the genus Allocasuarina native to a small area in the Mid West, South West, Wheatbelt and Goldfields-Esperance regions of Western Australia.

It produces yellow-red-brown flowers from August to January and is found in sandy and gravelly lateritic soils.

References

External links
  Occurrence data for Allocasuarina microstachya from The Australasian Virtual Herbarium

microstachya
Rosids of Western Australia
Fagales of Australia
Dioecious plants